Øyvind Berg (born March 10, 1971 in Løken) is a Norwegian former ski jumper who competed from 1983 to 1996.

He won a gold medal in the team large hill at the 1993 FIS Nordic World Ski Championships and finished 22nd in the individual normal hill at those same championships.

Berg's best individual finish at the Winter Olympics was 17th in the individual large hill at Lillehammer in 1994. His best individual career finish was third in Trondheim in 1991.

He represented the sports club Høland IL.

References

1971 births
Living people
People from Aurskog-Høland
Ski jumpers at the 1992 Winter Olympics
Ski jumpers at the 1994 Winter Olympics
Olympic ski jumpers of Norway
FIS Nordic World Ski Championships medalists in ski jumping
Sportspeople from Viken (county)